The 2007 NERFU college men's Division IV rugby tournament featured eight teams from four conferences. The top two teams in each conference were seeded according to the success of their conference in the previous year.

In the championship match at the Kirwin Memorial Pitch at Fort Adams in Newport, Rhode Island, newcomer Salve Regina University lost to the University of Massachusetts Dartmouth by a score of 34–15. The match was well attended.  Following the match, both UMASS Dartmouth and Salve Regina were promoted to Division III for the 2008 season.

Cup championship bracket

References

2008
NERFU
NERFU